State Route 273 (SR 273) is a two-lane east–west state highway in Logan and Hardin counties in the U.S. state of Ohio.  It begins at an intersection with State Route 31 in Mt. Victory, passes through Belle Center, and ends in a dead end on Long Island at Indian Lake.  Along the way, it intersects State Route 292 (north of Ridgeway), State Route 274 (north of the crossroads of Big Springs), US 68 (at the former location of Whitestown, today occupied only by a butcher's shop), and State Route 638 (in Belle Center).  It overlaps State Route 117 for a short distance near Indian Lake.

West of State Route 117, State Route 273 continues for two miles (3 km), to the Indian Lake community of Long Island. This is an unincorporated area with approximately 200 permanent and 1,000 seasonal residents. The state highway ends at the bridge to Long Island.

History
SR 273 was commissioned in 1930 between SR 117 and SR 53, later became US 68. In 1937, the highway was extended west to its current western terminus on Long Island. In the same year the route was extended east to its current eastern terminus in Mt. Victory.

Major intersections

References

External links

 Logan County Highway Map

State highways in Ohio
Transportation in Hardin County, Ohio
Transportation in Logan County, Ohio